Wilga  is a village in Garwolin County, Masovian Voivodeship, in east-central Poland. It is the seat of the gmina (administrative district) called Gmina Wilga.

The village has an approximate population of 1,000.

External links
 Jewish Community in Wilga on Virtual Shtetl

References

Wilga
Masovian Voivodeship (1526–1795)
Siedlce Governorate
Lublin Governorate
Lublin Voivodeship (1919–1939)
Warsaw Voivodeship (1919–1939)